The Roman Catholic Diocese of Orléans (Latin: Dioecesis Aurelianensis; French: Diocèse d'Orléans) is a diocese of the Latin Church of the Roman Catholic Church in France. The diocese currently corresponds to the Départment of Loiret. The current bishop is Jacques André Blaquart, who was appointed in 2010.

The diocese has experienced a number of transfers among different metropolitans. In 1622, the diocese was suffragan of the Archdiocese of Paris; previously the diocese had been a suffragan of the Archdiocese of Sens. From 1966 until 2001 it was under the jurisdiction of the Archdiocese of Bourges, but since the provisional reorganisation of French ecclesiastical provinces, it is now subject to the Archdiocese of Tours.

After the Revolution it was re-established by the Concordat of 1802. It then included the Departments of Loiret and Loir et Cher, but in 1822 Loir et Cher was moved to the new Diocese of Blois.

Jurisdiction

The present Diocese of Orléans differs considerably from that of the old regime; it has lost the arrondissement of Romorantin which has passed to the Diocese of Blois and the canton of Janville, now in the Diocese of Chartres. It includes the arrondissement of Montargis, formerly subject to the Archdiocese of Sens, the arrondissement of Gien, once in the Burgundian Diocese of Auxerre, and the canton of Châtillon sur Loire, once belonging to the Archdiocese of Bourges.

History

To Gerbert, Abbot of St. Pierre le Vif at Sens (1046–79), is due a detailed narrative according to which Saint Savinianus and Saint Potentianus were sent to Sens by St. Peter with St. Altinus; the latter, it was said, came to Orléans as its first bishop. Before the ninth century there is no historical trace in the Diocese of Sens of this Apostolic mission of St. Altinus, nor in the Diocese of Orléans before the end of the fifteenth. Diclopitus is the first authentic bishop; he figures among the bishops of Gaul who (about 344) ratified the absolution of St. Athanasius. Other bishops of the early period are: St. Euvertius (who features in the Calendar of the Book of Common Prayer), about 355 to 385, according to M. Cuissard; Anianus (385-453), who invoked the aid of the "patrician" Ætius against the invasion of Attila, and forced the Huns to raise the siege of Orléans [see Gregory of Tours, The History of the Franks II.6-7]; St. Prosper (453-63); St. Monitor (about 472); St. Flou (Flosculus), died in 490; St. Eucherius (717-43), native of Orléans and a monk of Jumièges, who protested against the depredations of Waifre, a companion of Charles Martel, and was first exiled by this prince to Cologne, then to Liège, and died at the monastery of St. Trond.

After his victory over the Alamanni, the Frankish king Clovis was bent on the sack of Verdun, but the archpriest there obtained mercy for his fellow-citizens. To St. Euspicius and his nephew St. Mesmin (Maximinus), Clovis also gave the domain of Micy, near Orléans at the confluence of the Loire and the Loiret, for a monastery (508). When Euspicius died, the said St. Maximinus became abbot, and during his rule the religious life flourished there notably. The monks of Micy contributed much to the civilization of the Orléans region; they cleared and drained the lands and taught the semi-barbarous inhabitants the worth and dignity of agricultural work. Early in the eighth century, Theodulfus restored the Abbey of Micy and at his request St. Benedict of Aniane sent fourteen monks and visited the abbey himself. The last abbot of Micy, Chapt de Rastignac, was one of the victims of the 1792 "September Massacres", at Paris, in the prison of L'Abbaye.

From Micy monastery, which counted many saints, monastic life spread within and around the diocese. St. Liphardus and St. Urbicius founded the Abbey of Meung-sur-Loire; St. Lyé (Lætus) died a recluse in the forest of Orléans; St. Viatre (Viator) in Sologne; St. Doulchard in the forest of Ambly near Bourges. St. Leonard introduced the monastic life into the territory of Limoges; St. Almir, St. Ulphacius, and St. Bomer in the vicinity of Montmirail; St. Avitus (died about 527) in the district of Chartres; St. Calais (died before 536) and St. Leonard of Vendœuvre (died about 570) in the valley of the Sarthe; St. Fraimbault and St. Constantine in the Javron forest, and the aforesaid St. Bomer (died about 560) in the Passais near Laval; St. Leonard of Dunois; St. Alva and St. Ernier in Perche; St. Laumer (died about 590) became Abbot of Corbion. St. Lubin (Leobinus), a monk of Micy, became Bishop of Chartres from 544–56. Finally saint Ay (Agilus), Viscount of Orléans (died after 587), was also a protector of Micy.

Saints

Among the notable saints of the diocese are:

St. Baudilus, a Nîmes martyr (third or fourth century)
 the deacon St. Lucanus, martyr, patron of Loigny (fifth century)
 the anchorite St. Donatus (fifth century)
 St. May, abbot of Val Benoît (fifth century)
 St. Mesme, virgin and (perhaps) martyr, sister of St. Mesmin (sixth century)
 St. Felicule, patroness of Gien (sixth century)
 St. Sigismund, King of Burgundy, who, by order of the Merovingian Clodomir, and despite the entreaties of St. Avitus, was thrown (524) into a well with his wife and children
 St. Gontran, King of Orléans and Burgundy (561-93), a confessor
St. Loup (Lupus), Archbishop of Sens, born near Orléans, and his mother St. Agia (first half of the seventh century)
 St. Gregory, former Bishop of Nicopolis, in Bulgaria, who died a recluse at Pithiviers (1004 or 1007)
 St. Rose, Abbess of Ervauville (died 1130)
 Blessed Odo of Orléans, Bishop of Cambrai (1105–13)
 the leper St. Alpaix, died in 1211 at Cudot where she was visited by queen Adèle of Champagne, widow of Louis VII
 St. Guillaume (died 1209), Abbot of Fontainejean and subsequently Archbishop of Bourges
 the Dominican Blessed Reginald, dean of the collegiate church of St. Aignan, Orléans (died 1220)
 the Englishman St. Richard, who studied theology at Orléans in 1236, Bishop of Chichester in 1244, a friend of St. Edmund of Canterbury

St. Maurus, called to France by St. Innocent, Bishop of Le Mans, and sent thither by St. Benedict, resided at Orléans with four companions in 542. St. Radegonde, on her way from Noyon to Poitiers in 544, and St. Columbanus, exiled from Luxeuil at the close of the sixth century, both visited Orléans. Charlemagne had the church of St. Aignan rebuilt and reconstructed the monastery of St. Pierre le Puellier. In the cathedral of Orléans on 31 December 987, Hugh Capet had his son Robert (born at Orléans) crowned king. Innocent II and St. Bernard visited Fleury and Orléans in 1130.

Pilgrimages
The principal pilgrimages of the diocese are: Our Lady of Bethlehem, at Ferrières; Our Lady of Miracles in Orléans city, dating back to the seventh century (Joan of Arc visited the sanctuary on 8 May 1429); Our Lady of Cléry, dating from the thirteenth century, visited by kings Philip the Fair, Philip VI, and especially by Louis XI, who wore in his hat a leaden image of Notre Dame de Cléry and who wished to have his tomb in this sanctuary where Jean de Dunois, one of the heroes of the Hundred Years' War, was also interred.

Later history

The people of Orléans were so impressed by the preaching of Blessed Robert of Arbrissel in 1113 that he was invited to found the monastery of La Madeleine, which he re-visited in 1117 with St. Bernard of Thiron. The charitable deeds of king St. Louis at Puiseaux, Châteauneuf-sur-Loire, and Orléans, where he was present at the translation of the relics of St. Aignan (26 October 1259), and where he frequently went to care for the poor of the Hôtel Dieu, are well known. Pierre de Beaufort, Archdeacon of Sully and canon of Orléans, was, as Gregory XI (1371-8), the last pope that France gave to the Church; he created Cardinal Jean de la Tour d'Auvergne, Abbot of St. Benoît-sur Loire. Blessed Jeanne de Valois was Duchess of Orléans and after her separation from Louis XII (1498) she established, early in the sixteenth century, the monastery of L'Annonciade at Châteauneuf-sur-Loire. Etienne Dolet (1509–46), a printer, philologian, and pamphleteer, executed at Paris and looked upon by some as a "martyr of the Renaissance", was a native of Orléans. Cardinal Odet de Coligny, who joined the Reformation about 1560, was Abbot of St. Euvertius, of Fontainejean, Ferrières, and St. Benoît. Admiral Coligny (1519–72) (see Saint Bartholomew's Day) was born at Châtillon-sur-Loing in the present diocese. At the beginning of the religious wars, Orléans was disputed between the followers of the Guise family and of the Protestant Condé. In the vicinity of Orléans, Duke Francis of Guise was assassinated on 3 February 1562.

The Calvinist Jacques Bongars, councillor of king Henry IV of France, who collected and edited the chronicles of the Crusades in his "Gesta Dei per Francos", was born at Orléans in 1554. The Jesuit Denis Petav (Petavius), a renowned scholar and theologian, was born at Orléans in 1583. St. Francis of Sales came to Orléans in 1618 and 1619. Venerable Mother Françoise de la Croix (1591–1657), a pupil of St. Vincent de Paul, who founded the congregation of Augustinian Sisters of Charity of Notre Dame, was born at Petay in the diocese. The Miramion family, to which Marie Bonneau is celebrated in the annals of charity under the name of Mme de Miramion (1629–96), belonged by marriage, were from Orléans. St. Jane de Chantal was superior of the Orléans convent of the Visitation in 1627. Mme Guyon, celebrated in the annals of Quietism, was born at Montargis in 1648.

France was saved from English domination through the deliverance of Orléans by Joan of Arc (8 May 1429). On 21 July 1455, her rehabilitation was publicly proclaimed at Orléans in a solemn procession, and before her death in November 1458, Isabel Romée, the mother of Joan of Arc, saw a monument erected in honour of her daughter, at Tournelles, near the Orléans bridge. The monument, destroyed by the Huguenots in 1567, was set up again in 1569 when the Catholics were once more masters of the city. Until 1792, and again from 1802 to 1830, finally from 1842 to the present day, a great religious feast, celebrated 8 May of every year at Orléans in honour of Joan of Arc, attracted multitudes.

The Church of Orléans was the last in France to take up again the Roman liturgy (1874). The Sainte Croix cathedral, perhaps built and consecrated by St. Euvertius in the fourth century, was destroyed by fire in 999 and rebuilt from 1278 to 1329; the Protestants pillaged and destroyed it from 1562 to 1567; the Bourbon kings restored it in the seventeenth century.

Modernity

Prior to the Associations Law of 1901, the Diocese of Orléans counted Franciscans, Benedictines, Missionary Priests of the Society of Mary, Lazarists, Missionaries of the Sacred Heart and several orders of teaching Brothers. Among the congregations of women which originated in this diocese must be mentioned: the Calvary Benedictines, a teaching and nursing order founded in 1617 by Princess Antoinette d'Orléans-Longueville, and the Capuchin Leclerc du Tremblay known as Père Joseph; the Sisters of St. Aignan, a teaching order founded in 1853 by Bishop Dupanloup, with mother-house in Orléans.

Twentieth-century bishops of Orleans included Guy Riobé, whose opposition to nuclear weapons led to an altercation with a member of Georges Pompidou's government, and his successor, Jean-Marie Lustiger, who was appointed in 1979 after a long interregnum and shortly afterwards translated to Paris.

Episcopal Ordinaries

Of the eighth-century bishops, Theodulfus was notable. It is not known when he began to govern, but it is certain that he was already bishop in 798, when Charlemagne sent him into Narbonne and Provence as missus dominicus. Under king Louis le Débonnaire he was accused of aiding the rebellious King of Italy, was deposed and imprisoned four years in a monastery at Angers, but was released when Louis came to Angers in 821, reportedly after hearing Theodulfus sing All Glory, Laud and Honour. The "Capitularies" which Theodulfus addressed to the clergy of Orléans are considered a most important monument of Catholic tradition on the duties of priests and the faithful. His Ritual, his Penitential, his treatise on baptism, confirmation and the Eucharist, his edition of the Bible, a work of fine penmanship preserved in the Puy cathedral, reveal him as one of the foremost men of his time. His fame rests chiefly on his devotion to the spread of learning. The Abbey of Ferrières was then becoming under Alcuin a centre of learning. Theodulfus opened the Abbey of Fleury to the young noblemen sent thither by Charlemagne, invited the clergy to establish free schools in the country districts, and quoted for them, "These that are learned shall shine as the brightness of the firmament: and they that instruct many to justice, as stars to all eternity" (Dan., xii 3). One monument of his time still survives in the diocese, the apse of the church of Germigny-des-Prés modelled after the imperial chapel, and yet retaining its unique mosaic decoration.

Medieval Bishops
 Aignan of Orleans, or Agnan (Latin: Anianus) (b. 358 – d. 453), assisted Roman general Flavius Aetius in the defense of the city against Attila the Hun in 451.
 Namatius, an ambassador of King Guntram to the Bretons
 Eucherius of Orléans
 Jonas (821 – 843), who wrote a treatise against the Iconoclasts, also a treatise on the Christian life and a book on the duties of kings
 St. Thierry II (1016 – 21)
 Jean, consecrated on 1 March 1098
 Blessed Philip Berruyer (1234 – 1236)
 Blessed Roger le Fort (1321 – 1328)
 John Carmichael of Douglasdale (Jean de St Michel)
 Regnault de Chartres † (9 Jan 1439 Appointed – 4 Apr 1444 Died)
 Pierre Bureau † (20 Nov 1447 Appointed – 10 Dec 1451 Appointed, Bishop of Béziers)
 François de Brillac † (3 Nov 1473 Appointed – 22 Dec 1504 Appointed, Archbishop of Aix)
 Christophe de Brillac † (19 Jan 1504 Appointed – 4 Feb 1514 Appointed, Archbishop of Tours)
 Jean d’Orléans-Longueville † (26 Jun 1521 Appointed – 24 Sep 1533 Died)
 Antoine Sanguin de Meudon † (6 Nov 1533 Appointed – 20 Oct 1550 Resigned)
 François de Faucon † (20 Oct 1550 Appointed – 12 Oct 1551 Appointed, Bishop of Mâcon)
 Pierre du Chastel † (12 Oct 1551 Appointed – 3 Feb 1552 Died)
 Jean de Morvilliers † (27 Apr 1552 Appointed – 1564 Resigned)
 Mathurin de la Saussaye † (6 Sep 1564 Appointed – 9 Feb 1584 Died)
 Denis Hurault † (9 Feb 1584 Succeeded – 1586 Resigned)
 Germain Vaillant de Guelin † (27 Oct 1586 Appointed – 15 Sep 1587 Died)
 Jean de L’Aubespine † (16 Mar 1588 Appointed – 23 Feb 1596 Died)

Early Modern Bishops
 Gabriel de L’Aubespine † (15 Mar 1604 Appointed – 15 Aug 1630 Died)
 Nicolas de Netz † (27 Jan 1631 Appointed – 20 Jan 1646 Died)
 Alphonse d’Elbène † (21 Jan 1647 Appointed – 20 May 1665 Died)
 Pierre-Armand du Cambout de Coislin † (29 Mar 1666 Confirmed – 5 Feb 1706 Died)
 Louis-Gaston Fleuriau d’Armenonville † (15 Nov 1706 Confirmed – 9 Jun 1733 Died)
 Nicolas-Joseph de Paris † (9 Jun 1733 Succeeded – 10 Jan 1754 Resigned)
 Louis-Joseph de Montmorency-Laval † (14 Jan 1754 Confirmed – 28 Feb 1758 Resigned)
 Louis-Sextius de Jarente de La Bruyère † (13 Mar 1758 Confirmed – 28 May 1788 Died)
 Louis-François-Alexandre de Jarente de Senas d’Orgeval † (28 May 1788 Succeeded – 22 Nov 1793 Resigned)

Modern Bishops
Etienne-Alexandre-Jean-Baptiste-Marie Bernier † (9 Apr 1802 Appointed – 1 Oct 1806 Died)
Claude-Louis Rousseau † (22 Mar 1807 Appointed – 7 Oct 1810 Died)
Pierre-Marin Rouph de Varicourt † (8 Aug 1817 Appointed – 9 Dec 1822 Died)
Jean Brumault de Beauregard † (13 Jan 1823 Appointed – Jan 1839 Retired)
François-Nicholas-Madeleine Morlot † (10 Mar 1839 Appointed – 28 Jun 1842 Appointed, Archbishop of Tours)
Jean-Jacques Fayet † (10 Oct 1842 Appointed – 4 Apr 1849 Died)
Félix-Antoine-Philibert Dupanloup † (16 Apr 1849 Appointed – 11 Oct 1878 Died)
Pierre-Hector Coullié (Couillié) † (12 Oct 1878 Succeeded – 14 Jun 1893 Appointed, Archbishop of Lyon)
Stanislas-Arthur-Xavier Touchet † (29 Jan 1894 Appointed – 23 Sep 1926 Died)
Jules-Marie-Victor Courcoux † (20 Dec 1926 Appointed – 28 Mar 1951 Died)
Robert Picard de La Vacquerie † (27 Aug 1951 Appointed – 23 May 1963 Resigned)
Guy-Marie-Joseph Riobé † (23 May 1963 Succeeded – 18 Jul 1978 Died)
Jean-Marie Lustiger † (10 Nov 1979 Appointed – 31 Jan 1981 Appointed, Archbishop of Paris)
René Lucien Picandet † (13 Jun 1981 Appointed – 20 Oct 1997 Died)
Gérard Antoine Daucourt (2 Jul 1998 Appointed – 18 Jun 2002 Appointed, Bishop of Nanterre)
André Louis Fort (28 Nov 2002 Appointed – 27 Jul 2010 Retired)
Jacques André Blaquart (27 Jul 2010 Appointed – )

See also
 Catholic Church in France

References

Bibliography

Reference works
  (Use with caution; obsolete)
  (in Latin) 
 (in Latin)

Studies

External links
  Centre national des Archives de l'Église de France, L’Épiscopat francais depuis 1919, retrieved: 2016-12-24.

 

Orleans